Dipleurosoma is a genus of hydrozoans belonging to the family Dipleurosomatidae.

The species of this genus are found in Northern America.

Species:

Dipleurosoma gemmifera 
Dipleurosoma pacificum 
Dipleurosoma typicum

References

Dipleurosomatidae
Hydrozoan genera